The 8th Signals Intelligence Battalion "Tonale" is an inactive signals intelligence (SIGINT) battalion of the Italian Army. The battalion was formed in 1976 and named  for the Tonale Pass. The battalion was the army's strategic signals intelligence unit during the Cold War. The battalion was disbanded in 1998 and its tasks and personnel were transferred to the army's 33rd Electronic Warfare Battalion "Falzarego" and the Italian Armed Forces' Information and Security Department. In 2001 the battalion was reformed as the second signal battalion of the deployable 11th Signal Regiment.

History 
On 1 September 1970 the army's Electronic Defense Center in Anzio formed a Signals Intelligence Team. On 1 November 1972 the team was expanded to SIGINT Unit and began to build signal interception stations all over Italy.

During the 1975 army reform the army disbanded the regimental level and battalions were granted for the first time their own flags. During the reform signal battalions were renamed for mountain passes. On 1 September 1976 the SIGINT Unit was renamed 8th Signals Intelligence Battalion "Tonale". On the same day the Electronic Defense Center's IX Electronic Warfare Battalion was renamed 9th Electronic Warfare Battalion "Rombo" was formed by the.

The battalion became the spiritual successor of the Special Marconists Battalion, which had been formed by the 8th Engineer Regiment during World War II, and was the Royal Italian Army General Staff's signal interception and radio direction finding battalion. The 8th Signals Intelligence Battalion "Tonale" consisted of a command, a command and services platoon, and two SIGINT companies. On 12 November 1976 the battalion was granted a flag by decree 846 of the President of the Italian Republic Giovanni Leone. The flags of the Tonale, 9th Electronic Warfare Battalion "Rombo", and Electronic Defense Center arrived at the units on 22 March 1977.

On 2 January 1987 the battalion doubled in size and now consisted of a command, a command and services company, and four SIGINT companies.

On 1 January 1998 the 8th Signals Intelligence Battalion "Tonale" was disbanded and its personnel transferred either to the 33rd Electronic Warfare Battalion "Falzarego" or the Information and Security Department of the Italian Armed Forces' General Staff, while the battalion's flag was transferred to the Shrine of the Flags in the Vittoriano in Rome.

On 27 August 2001 the battalion was reformed as Battalion "Tonale" and assigned to the 11th Signal Regiment as the regiment's second signal battalion.

References

Signal Regiments of Italy